Caluya, officially the Municipality of Caluya, is a 1st class municipality in the province of Antique, Philippines. According to the 2020 census, it has a population of 38,908 people, making it the sixth most populous municipality in the province.

History

The Island of Caluya was once called Polo Pandan by Moro pirates searching for commercial ships as target victims. These pirates with their pillager vintas called "Salipsipan" utilized the place for haven and rest after divesting ships of valuable belongings. In fear of the pirates, only few fishermen dared to fish in the area. The Moro pirates called the place Polo Pandan because the entire coastal area was covered by pandan screw pines.

Several years later, fishermen from other islands, who were catching turtles for Chinese traders using their fish gears called "Panalog", accidentally landed in Polo Pandan in search of drinking water.  They were surprised to see footprints of humans in the sand but no houses could be seen. They found a potable spring coming from the roots of a Dankalan Tree. They brought the good news to other fishermen and settled by the shore near that spring. They made huts (Barong-barong) for their families and continued with their fishing activities. Eventually, the Moro pirates landed at the other side of the island.  The settlers feared for the safety of their families, so they transferred their huts to the hilltop and called the place "Minoro or Barabanwa."

One day, while all the male settlers were out looking for food and fishing, the Moro pirates surfaced and an amazon named Merin gathered all women to defend their settlement. The Moro leader, upon seeing the amazons, ordered his men to retreat for according to him, the women were weak or maluya in vernacular. Thus the name Polo Pandan was changed to maluya in honor of famous hero Merin. The island soon became Caluya.

Spanish settlement
The Spanish settlement in Caluya was established around 1850. Spanish friars came to the island to propagate their colonization of the archipelago. The settlement was called Barangay and the first Cabeza de Barangay was Balbino Alojado (later changed his surname to Ysug) succeeded by Luciano Boctot and then by Surato Bunga-Bunga. All other Cabezas de Barangay was not recorded.

Later on, the Cabeza de Barangay became Capitan de Barangay. The first Capitan de Barangay was Lozaro Decena succeeded by Luciano Tabangay and then by Mariano Escultor.

In the year 1893, believed to be in the month of May, the Barangay was changed to Pueblo or town by the Spanish Government, hence the founding of the Municipality of Caluya.

American regime
The American Government started in 1901. Caluya was run by the people from Bulalacao, Oriental Mindoro and became its town. The first officials were appointed by Americans but later, the officials were elected by the people. The head of the local government was the Town President or Presidente del Pueblo. Appointed President from 1901 to 1910 was Feliciano Erodias. Next was Valentin Escultor in 1911. Then they held the first election in 1913 and the first elected president was Moises Lucena. In 1916, the President was Elias Tameta; 1919, Luis Erodias; 1922, Agustin Madarcos; 1925, Pedro Janairo; and 1928, Ruperto Tabinas.

In 1934, the head of the town was changed to a town Mayor. The 1st town Mayor was Claro Erodias who served up to 1938. Ruperto Tabinas was the town Mayor when the World War II broke out.

Japanese occupation
In 1943, the Japanese landed in Caluya by means of motorboat and spread their propaganda about the government. No battle had been fought for there were no soldiers in the island. The Japanese commandeered pigs, carabaos, cows, chickens and other foods for consumption.

The only battle fought was in Semirara. It was between the five Japanese battle ships and the U.S. Air force. War ships were sunk and an airplane from the Allied Force was drowned. About 200 Japanese marines fled to Capiz Island led by Commander Tanaka. There was no known Mayor at that time.

Post-liberation period
In, 1945, Mr. Joven Janairo was appointed Mayor, and in the 1948 election, he was elected to the position. He was succeeded by Romulo Lumawig in 1953 but was re-elected in 1958. Romulo Lumawig was re-elected in 1964 and Oscar Lim was elected in 1972. Soon, Martial law was proclaimed by President Ferdinand Marcos.

In 1987, Douglas Egina was appointed as OIC-Mayor. Then in 1988, Oscar Lim was re-elected And in the year 1992, when election was again conducted, the first woman Mayor Nikita L. Frangue was elected and succeeded by her husband Domingo G. Frangue,Jr. who served from July 1, 2001, up to June 30, 2007.  Reynante J. Lim,Sr. was the Municipal Mayor from July 1, 2007, until his death on February 28, 2010. Diosdado L. Egina acted as Mayor from March 1, 2010, to June 30, 2010. Genevive G. Lim-Reyes is the present Municipal Mayor of Caluya.

Geography

According to the Philippine Statistics Authority, the municipality has a land area of  constituting  of the  total area of Antique.

List of islands in Caluya by land area:
Semirara Island  Sibay Island  Caluya Island  Sibolo Island  
Sibato Island .

Climate

Barangays
Caluya is politically subdivided into 18 barangays.

Demographics

In the 2020 census, Caluya had a population of 38,908.

Economy

References

External links
 
 [ Philippine Standard Geographic Code]

Municipalities of Antique (province)
Mining communities in the Philippines
Island municipalities in the Philippines